Parliamentary privilege is a legal immunity enjoyed by members of certain legislatures, in which legislators are granted protection against civil or criminal liability for actions done or statements made in the course of their legislative duties. It is common in countries whose constitutions are based on the Westminster system.

Origins 
In the United Kingdom, it allows members of the House of Lords and House of Commons to speak freely during ordinary parliamentary proceedings without fear of legal action on the grounds of slander, contempt of court or breaching the Official Secrets Act. It also means that members of Parliament cannot be arrested on civil matters for statements made or acts undertaken as an MP within the grounds of the Palace of Westminster, on the condition that such statements or acts occur as part of a proceeding in Parliament—for example, as a question to the Prime Minister in the House of Commons. This allows Members to raise questions or debate issues which could slander an individual, interfere with an ongoing court case or threaten to reveal state secrets, such as in the Zircon affair or several cases mentioned by the Labour MP Tam Dalyell.

There is no immunity from arrest on criminal grounds, nor does the civil privilege entirely extend to the devolved administrations in Scotland or Wales. A consequence of the privilege of free speech is that legislators in Westminster systems are forbidden by conventions of their House from uttering certain words, or implying that another member is lying. (See unparliamentary language.)

The rights and privileges of members are overseen by the powerful Committee on Standards and Privileges. If a member of the House is in breach of the rules then he/she can be suspended or even expelled from the House. Such past breaches have included giving false evidence before a committee of the House and the taking of bribes by members.

Similar rights apply in other Westminster system countries such as Canada and Australia. In the United States, the Speech or Debate Clause in Article One of the United States Constitution provides for a similar privilege, and many state constitutions provide similar clauses for their state legislatures.

Parliamentary privilege is controversial because of its potential for abuse; a member can use privilege to make damaging allegations that would ordinarily be discouraged by defamation laws, whether or not those allegations have a strong foundation. A member could, even more seriously, undermine national security and/or the safety of an ongoing military or covert operation or undermine relations with a foreign state by releasing sensitive military or diplomatic information.

United Kingdom 

The ancient and undoubted rights and privileges of the Commons are claimed by the Speaker at the beginning of each new Parliament. The privileges are only codified in Erskine May: Parliamentary Practice and the House itself is the only judge of its own privileges. Most of those specifically claimed are practically obsolete, but others remain very real:

 Freedom of speech; (members speaking in the House are not liable for defamation)
 Freedom from arrest in civil matters (practically obsolete);
 Access of the Commons to the Crown (via the Speaker); and
 That the most favourable construction should be placed upon the deliberations of the Commons.

Privileges not specifically mentioned:

 Right of the House to regulate its own composition; (although election petitions are now determined by the ordinary Courts)
 Right of the House to regulate its own internal proceedings, both as to matters and procedures;
 Right to punish members and "strangers" for breach of privilege and contempt;
 Right of freedom from interference (although members are no longer immune from all civil actions)

Parliamentary papers 
There is an absolute common law privilege for papers circulated among MPs by order of the House (Lake v. King (1667) 1 Saunders 131). This is extended to all papers published under the House's authority, and to correct copies by the Parliamentary Papers Act 1840. The Act also extends qualified privilege to extracts.

Select committees 
In addition to applying to members' speech within the chamber, parliamentary privilege also applies to select committees. Written and oral evidence given to, and published by these committees is also subject to the same absolute privilege as parliamentary papers. This means that any evidence given by a witness to a select committee may not be used against them or any other person in a court of law, whether for civil or criminal proceedings. This privilege only applies, however, if the committee has formally accepted it as evidence and does not apply to materials published before they were given to the committee.

In Canada 
In Canada, the Senate and House of Commons and provincial legislative assemblies follow the definition of parliamentary privilege offered by the British parliamentary authority, Erskine May's Treatise on The Law, Privileges, Proceedings and Usage of Parliament, which defines parliamentary privilege as "the sum of the peculiar rights enjoyed by each House collectively as a constituent part of the High Court of Parliament, and by Members of each house individually, without which they could not discharge their function... the privileges of Parliament are rights which are absolutely necessary for the due execution of its powers. They are enjoyed by individual Members, because the House cannot perform its functions without unimpeded use of the service of its Members, and by each House for the protection of its members and the vindication of its own authority and dignity." Parliamentary privilege can therefore be claimed by Members individually or by the House collectively.

The rule for when parliamentary privilege applies is that it cannot exceed the powers, privileges and immunities of the imperial parliament as it stood in 1867, when the first constitution was written.

Individual parliamentary privileges include:
 Freedom of speech
 Freedom from arrest in civil action
 Exemption from jury duty
 Exemption from appearing as a witness
 Freedom from obstruction, interference, intimidation and molestation

Collective parliamentary privileges include:
 Power to discipline
 Regulation of the House's internal affairs
 Management of employees
 Authority to maintain the attendance and service of Members
 Right to institute inquiries and to call witnesses and demand papers
 Right to administer oaths to witnesses
 Right to publish papers containing defamatory material

The Supreme Court of Canada has previously dealt with the question of parliamentary privilege in New Brunswick Broadcasting Co. v. Nova Scotia (Speaker of the House of Assembly). In that case, the Court made these observations about parliamentary privilege:

Recent cases of parliamentary privilege in Canada adjudicated by the courts include:
 1993: New Brunswick Broadcasting Co. v. Nova Scotia (Speaker of the House of Assembly), where the courts held parliament could restrict who could enter the parliamentary precincts.
 1999: Zundel v. Boudria, et al., where the courts held parliament could restrict who could enter the parliamentary precincts.
 2001: Ontario (Speaker of the Legislative Assembly) v. Ontario (Human Rights Commission), where the courts held the actions of the provincial legislative assembly were immune from review by other government bodies including the Human Rights Commission.
 2005: Canada (House of Commons) v. Vaid, where the Supreme Court of Canada analyzed the scope of parliamentary privilege and the role of courts in deciding its existence.

In Australia 

In 1904, the Parliament of Western Australia imprisoned John Drayton for three weeks for a breach of parliamentary privilege.

In 1955, a newspaper proprietor Raymond Fitzpatrick and his editor Frank Browne were jailed by the Australian House of Representatives for three months for what the House considered a gross breach of parliamentary privilege. The public and most commentators, then and since, felt the punishment far outweighed the crime.

Management of employees 
This privilege was considered in the South Australian Employment Court in the case of Kosmas v Legislative Council (SA) and Others [2007] SAIRC 86. The Court found that employment statutes apply to the Parliament and therefore employees can seek judicial relief for matters such as unfair dismissal or workers compensation.

In New Zealand 
The New Zealand Parliament accords its members parliamentary privilege like its British counterpart, preventing members for being sued or prosecuted for anything that was said on the floor while in session.

In India 
The government of India, based largely on the Westminster model, grants limited immunity from legal proceedings to members of Parliament and State Legislature under Articles 105 and 194 respectively, of the Indian Constitution. Article 105(2) reads as follows:
No member of Parliament shall be liable to any proceedings in any court in respect of anything said or any vote given by him in Parliament or any committee thereof, and no person shall be so liable in respect of the publication by or under the authority of either House of Parliament of any report, paper, votes or proceedings.

In South Africa 
Parliamentary privilege has existed in South Africa since the first legislatures were established in the 1850s.  Early laws on the subject included the Cape Colony's Freedom of Speech in Parliament Act 1854, and Natal's Law to Secure Freedom of Speech and Debates or Proceedings in the Legislative Council (1857) and Privileges of Parliament Act 1895.

The South Africa Act 1909, which established the Union of South Africa in 1910, provided that the Cape's system of parliamentary privilege would apply to the Union's parliament until such time as it made its own rules.  This served as an interim measure until the  Powers and Privileges of Parliament Act 1911 was passed.  After the country became a republic in 1961, the Act was replaced with the Powers and Privileges of Parliament Act 1963, which, in turn, was replaced with the Powers, Privileges and Immunities of Parliament and Provincial Legislatures Act 2003.

The 1993 'interim' Constitution expressly protected members of the National Assembly and the Senate against civil or criminal action for anything which he or she said, produced, submitted or revealed in or before parliament or any of its committees, and gave similar protection to members of provincial legislatures.  The 1996 Constitution contains similar provisions.

Helen Suzman used parliamentary privilege in her anti-apartheid campaigning. Helen Suzman reported during a 1994 interview that she was able to get around state of emergency rules applied against press reporting of violence in the country by asking questions in parliament about the subjects that the press were forbidden from talking about. South African legislation allowed anything said in parliament to be published in spite of emergency legislation. She commented on the hypocrisy of anti-apartheid campaigners criticising her for fighting apartheid from the inside in this way, yet publishing information revealed by her by means of parliamentary privilege.

In Singapore 
The Parliament of Singapore accords parliamentary privilege to it members, preventing them from being sued or prosecuted for anything said on the floor while parliament is in session, or during any parliamentary committee meetings.

Leading cases 
 Sir Thomas Haxey – free speech [1397]
 Richard Strode (Privilege of Parliament Act) [1512]
 George Ferrers – debt default [1542]
 Stockdale v. Hansard – defamation by Hansard [1839]
 Charles Bradlaugh – Oath of Allegiance [1880]
 Duncan Sandys – free speech [1938]
 Archibald Maule Ramsay – treason [1940]
 Garry Allighan – defamation [1947]
 Duncan Campbell (the Zircon affair) – free speech [1986]
 Neil Hamilton – cash for questions [1994]
 Bill Heffernan – free speech [2002]
 "Superinjunction" controversy:
 The Guardian–Trafigura affair – Right of the media to report proceedings covered by parliamentary privilege [2009]
 Fred Goodwin v News Group Newspapers Ltd and VBN and CTB v News Group Newspapers (Ryan Giggs) – Right of the media to report on anonymised court injunctions; parliamentary privilege used to allow the media to report the existence of injunctions and the parties involved [2011]
 An unnamed injunction in 2006 granted preventing participants of a case from speaking to individuals including "Members of Parliament, journalists, lawyers" on toxic chemicals in passenger ship water tanks and resulting illnesses – Right of constituents to speak to their MPs; existence revealed in a parliamentary question several years later. [2011]
 Ryan Giggs, a footballer, was suspected of committing adultery with Imogen Thomas, a Big Brother contestant, sought an injunction to prevent the media talking about the issue. He took legal action against Twitter, given that a Twitter user had named him among several celebrities as having taken out super-injunctions. Large numbers of people retweeted the comments and eventually, the Liberal Democrat MP John Hemming used parliamentary privilege to name Ryan Giggs. No prosecutions against Twitter users were pursued, firstly because of the impracticality of pursuing things and secondly because of the public outcry about celebrities using super-injunctions to evade accountability for sleazy behaviour.
 In the Republic of Ireland, Denis O'Brien lost a 2017 High Court case seeking to reprimand two TDs and RTÉ. After O'Brien had sought an injunction preventing RTÉ broadcasting his banking details, TDs Catherine Murphy and Pearse Doherty disclosed the details in Dáil Éireann speeches which were broadcast by RTÉ.

See also 
 Speech or Debate Clause of the United States Constitution
 Executive privilege

References

External links 
 British Council India's LEGAL eNEWS Theme article comparing British and Indian perspectives
 Australia's Parliamentary Privileges Act 1987
 Josh Chafetz, Democracy's Privileged Few: Legislative Privilege and Democratic Norms in the British and American Constitutions (Yale Univ. Press 2007)
 Simon Wigley, 'Parliamentary Immunity: Protecting Democracy or Protecting Corruption?,' Journal of Political Philosophy, Vol. 11, No.2, pp. 23–40.
 Erskine May, Parliamentary Practice: The Law, Privileges, Proceedings and Usage of Parliament, W.R. Mackay et al. (eds) (London: Butterworths, 2004)
 UK Parliament, Reports of the Joint Committee on Parliamentary Privilege in Session HL 43-I/ HC 214-I. (London: The Stationery Office Limited, 1999).
 Marc Van der Hulst, The Parliamentary Mandate. (Geneva: Inter-Parliamentary Union, 2001)
 Centre for Constitutional Studies, 'Parliamentary Privilege'  

Parliamentary procedure
Statutory law
Westminster system
Politics of the United Kingdom
Government in Canada